Kalix IP is a sports venue in Kalix, Sweden. It is the home of the bandy club, Kalix BF.

References

Bandy venues in Sweden
Sport in Kalix